Bo Rikard Larsson (born 1966) is a Swedish politician and former member of the Riksdag, the national legislature. A member of the Social Democratic Party, he represented Skåne County South between September 2014 and September 2022.

References

1960 births
Living people
Members of the Riksdag 2014–2018
Members of the Riksdag 2018–2022
Members of the Riksdag from the Social Democrats